Easy to Love is a 1953 Technicolor musical film directed by Charles Walters with choreography by Busby Berkeley. It stars Esther Williams, Van Johnson and Tony Martin. It was Williams' final aquatic film set in the United States.

Plot
Ray Lloyd runs a successful Cypress Gardens water show, but star attraction Julie Hallerton is overworked and unappreciated by Ray who doesn't know she is in love with him. She fibs about pretending to marry her aquatic partner Hank (John Bromfield) to try make Ray jealous but is persuaded by Ray to accompany him to New York instead.

Julie is hired to pose for a magazine lipstick ad, when handsome singer Barry Gordon takes the place of a male model and kisses her instead. Barry offers to introduce Julie to a promoter who agrees to hire her for a New York water show he produces. Moreover, he will pay her more and treat her better than does Ray.

When they return to Florida, a jealous Hank tells off Ray for not realizing how Julie truly feels about him. Her roommate Nancy whacks her accidentally with a water ski, knocking Julie cold. All three men in her life rush to her side.

By the end, Ray finally realizes he is in love with Julie and they embrace and kiss. Barry quickly turns his attention to another bathing beauty while Nancy reveals a romantic interest in Hank.

Cast
Esther Williams as Julie Hallerton
Van Johnson as Ray Lloyd
Tony Martin as Barry Gordon
John Bromfield as Hank
Edna Skinner as Nancy Parmel
Carroll Baker as Clarice
Hal Borne as Melvin, the pianist
Emory Parnell as Mr. Huffnagel

Cast notes:
This was Carroll Baker's film debut.
Hal Bourne is billed as "Hal Berns".

Production
MGM announced the film in October 1952. It was shot partly on location in Cypress Gardens starting 12 February 1953.

Carroll Baker made her film debut in a small role as a once-married woman interested in Tony Martin's character, and jealous of Esther Williams.

Tony Martin's wife Cyd Charisse visited the set during filming and appears in a cameo at the end of the film.

Reception
According to MGM records the film made $2,349,000 in the US and Canada and $1,440,000 elsewhere resulting in a profit of $385,000.

References

External links

1953 musical comedy films
1953 romantic comedy films
American musical comedy films
American romantic comedy films
American romantic musical films
Films directed by Charles Walters
Films set in Florida
Films shot in Florida
Metro-Goldwyn-Mayer films
Swimming films
Films produced by Joe Pasternak
Films with screenplays by William Roberts (screenwriter)
1950s English-language films
1950s American films